Węglarz, Węglorz, Wenglarz or Wenglorz is a surname which means "coalman" in Polish. Notable people with the surname include:
Damian Węglarz (born 1996), Polish football player
Jan Węglarz (born 1947), Polish computer scientist
David Weglarz (born 1981), American Distiller
Krzysztof Węglarz (born 1985), Polish judoka
Nick Weglarz (born 1987), Canadian baseball player

Polish-language surnames